The Americas Zone is one of three zones of regional competition in the 2019 Fed Cup.

Group I 
 Venue: Club Campestre Sede Llanogrande, Medellín, Colombia (clay)
 Date: 6–9 February

The eight teams were divided into two pools of four teams. The two pool winners took part in a play-off to determine the nation advancing to the World Group II play-offs. The two nations finishing last and second last in their pools took part in relegation play-offs, with the two losing nations being relegated to Group II for 2020.

Seeding

 1Fed Cup Rankings as of 12 November 2018

Pools

Play-offs

Final placements 

  was promoted to the 2019 Fed Cup World Group II play-offs.

Group II 
 Venue 1: Tennis Club Las Terrazas Miraflores, Lima, Peru (clay)
 Venue 2: Centro Nacional de Tenis, Santo Domingo, Dominican Republic (hard) 
 Dates: 16–20 April

The twelve teams will compete across two different venues, with 6 nations taking part in Lima, and 5 nations taking part in Santo Domingo. In Lima, the six teams will be divided into two pools of 3 teams. The winners of each pool will play-off to determine the nation advancing to Group I in 2020. In Santo Domingo, five nations will compete in one pool, with the winning nation promoted to Group I in 2020.

Seeding

 1Fed Cup Rankings as of 11 February 2019

Pools

Play-offs

Final placements 

References 

 Fed Cup Result, 2019 Americas Group I
 Fed Cup Result, 2019 Americas Group II

External links 
 Fed Cup website

 
Americas
Tennis tournaments in Colombia
Tennis tournaments in Peru
Tennis tournaments in the Dominican Republic
Fed Cup Americas Zone
Fed Cup Americas Zone
Fed Cup Americas Zone
2019 in Colombian tennis